Padma Vasanthi  is an Indian actress in the Kannada film industry. Some of the films of Padma Vasanthi as an actress include Maanasa Sarovara (1982) Bettada Hoovu (1985), Mussanje Mathu (2008).

Awards

Career
Padma Vasanthi has been part of more than 130 movies and many soap operas/serials in Kannada industry.

Selected filmography
 Maanasa Sarovara (1982)
 Dharani Mandala Madhyadolage (1983)
 Amrutha Ghalige (1984)
 Runamuktalu (1984)
 Shreemathi Kalyana (1996)
 Shiva Leele (1996) as Parvati
 Thavarina Thottilu (1996)
 Sangliyana Part-3 (1997)
 Nee Mudida Mallige (1997)
 Ajju (2004)
 Boyfriend (2005) ... Shiva's mother
 Dr. B. R. Ambedkar (2005)
 Care of Footpath (2006)
 Hettavara Kanasu (2006)
 Bombugalu Saar Bombugalu (2007)
 Vasanthakala (2008)
 Raam (2009) 
 Prithvi (2010) ... Basavaraj's wife
 Sri Kshetra Adi Chunchanagiri (2012)
 Govinda Govinda (2021 film)

See also

List of people from Karnataka
Cinema of Karnataka
List of Indian film actresses
Cinema of India

References

External links

Actresses in Kannada cinema
Actresses in Tamil cinema
Living people
Kannada people
Actresses from Karnataka
Actresses from Bangalore
Indian film actresses
21st-century Indian actresses
Actresses in Kannada television
Year of birth missing (living people)